Quebec Autoroute 440 may refer to:
Quebec Autoroute 440 (Laval)
Quebec Autoroute 440 (Quebec City)